Martin Damm and Andrei Olhovskiy were the defending champions, but Olhovskiy did not participate this year.  Damm partnered Jiří Novák, losing in the first round.

Mahesh Bhupathi and Leander Paes won the title, defeating Jim Courier and Alex O'Brien 7–5, 7–6 in the final.

Seeds

  Mahesh Bhupathi /  Leander Paes (champions)
  Martin Damm /  Jiří Novák (first round)
  Byron Black /  Jonathan Stark (first round)
  Richey Reneberg /  Cyril Suk (quarterfinals)

Draw

Draw

External links
Draw

1997 ATP Tour